Lingalaghanpur is a village and a mandal in Jangaon district in the state of Telangana in India.

References 

Villages in Jangaon district
Mandals in Jangaon district